Salbu is a surname. Notable people with the surname include:

 Bersvend Salbu (born 1968), Norwegian farmer and politician
 Konrad Salbu (1904–1986), Norwegian chess master
 Steve Salbu, American academic

Norwegian-language surnames